David O'Callaghan (born 1987) is a Gaelic footballer from Tralee, County Kerry. He has played with Kerry at every level and with his club side St Pat's, Blennerville.

He was only a panel member at minor and under-21 level. During the 2010 league, he was a surprise member of the Kerry panel, playing three games. He later joined the Kerry junior team and won an All-Ireland title in 2012.

References

1987 births
Living people
Kerry inter-county Gaelic footballers
St Pat's, Blennerville Gaelic footballers